Kenny Lala (born 3 October 1991) is a French professional footballer who plays as a right-back for Ligue 1 club Brest.

Career
Lala began his career with local amateur club ES Parisienne before signing with semi-professional club Paris at the age of 17. Prior to signing with the club, Lala had trials with professional clubs Lille, Caen, and Valenciennes. After two seasons playing on Paris' reserve team, he was promoted to the club's senior team for the 2010–11 season. A successful campaign, in which Lala made 33 league appearances, resulted in the player being linked to several Ligue 1 clubs, most notably Valenciennes who offered Paris €100,000 for his services.

Despite declining the initial offer, on 15 June 2011, Paris reached an agreement with Valenciennes on a transfer for Lala. He signed a four-year contract with the Northern outfit. Lala was assigned the number 18 shirt by manager Daniel Sanchez and was placed onto the club's first team, though he has played on the club's reserve team in the Championnat de France amateur. Lala made his professional debut on 6 November 2011 in a 1–1 draw with Rennes appearing as a substitute.

In June 2017, Lala joined Strasbourg on a two-year contract. In his time at the club, he was a regular starter.

On 1 February 2021, the last day of the 2020–21 winter transfer window, Lala moved to Super League Greece club Olympiacos.

Personal life
Lala was born in Villepinte and grew up in the 18th arrondissement of Paris near the Porte de Clignancourt. Lala is of Martiniquais descent. He has two sisters. Lala's mother previously worked as a saleswoman for Zara and was also his sports agent having handled the player's four-year fédérale contract he signed with Paris FC. She now works for the public management and construction company l'Opac de Paris.

Career statistics

Club

Honours
Strasbourg
Coupe de la Ligue: 2018–19

Olympiacos 
Super League Greece: 2020–21, 2021–22

Individual
UNFP Ligue 1 Player of the Month: December 2018
 UNFP Ligue 1 Team of the Year: 2018–19

References

External links
 
 
 
 Profile at Valenciennes FC

Living people
1991 births
People from Villepinte, Seine-Saint-Denis
French people of Martiniquais descent
French footballers
Footballers from Seine-Saint-Denis
Association football defenders
Paris FC players
Valenciennes FC players
RC Lens players
RC Strasbourg Alsace players
Olympiacos F.C. players
Stade Brestois 29 players
Ligue 1 players
Ligue 2 players
Super League Greece players
French expatriate footballers
French expatriate sportspeople in Greece
Expatriate footballers in Greece